Evolutionary economics is part of mainstream economics as well as a heterodox school of economic thought that is inspired by evolutionary biology. Much like mainstream economics,  it stresses complex interdependencies, competition, growth, structural change, and resource constraints but differs in the approaches which are used to analyze these phenomena. Some scholars prefer to call their evolutionary theory by a different names. Samuel Bowles named it "evolutionary social science"  and Joachim Rennstich called it "evolutionary systems theory".

Evolutionary economics deals with the study of processes that transform economy for firms, institutions, industries, employment, production, trade and growth within, through the actions of diverse agents from experience and interactions, using evolutionary methodology. Evolutionary economics analyzes the unleashing of a process of technological and institutional innovation by generating and testing a diversity of ideas which discover and accumulate more survival value for the costs incurred than competing alternatives. The evidence suggests that it could be adaptive efficiency that defines economic efficiency. Mainstream economic reasoning begins with the postulates of scarcity and rational agents (that is, agents modeled as maximizing their individual welfare), with the "rational choice" for any agent being a straightforward  exercise in mathematical optimization. There has been renewed interest in treating economic systems as evolutionary systems in the developing field of Complexity economics.

Evolutionary economics does not take the characteristics of either the objects of choice or of the decision-maker as fixed. Rather, its focus is on the non-equilibrium processes that transform the economy from within and their implications.  The processes in turn emerge from actions of diverse agents with bounded rationality who may learn from experience and interactions and whose differences contribute to the change.  The subject draws more recently on evolutionary game theory and on the evolutionary methodology of Charles Darwin and the non-equilibrium economics principle of circular and cumulative causation. It is naturalistic in purging earlier notions of economic change as teleological or necessarily improving the human condition.

A different approach is to apply evolutionary psychology principles to economics which is argued to explain problems such as inconsistencies and biases in rational choice theory. Basic economic concepts such as utility may be better viewed as due to preferences that maximized evolutionary fitness in the ancestral environment but not necessarily in the current one.

Predecessors
Marx based his theory of economic development on the premise of developing economic systems; specifically, over the course of history superior economic systems would replace inferior ones. Inferior systems were beset by internal contradictions and inefficiencies that make them impossible to survive over the long term. In Marx's scheme, feudalism was replaced by capitalism, which would eventually be superseded by socialism.

Veblen (1898) 
Thorstein Veblen (1898) coined the term "evolutionary economics" in English. He began his career in the midst of this period of intellectual ferment, and as a young scholar came into direct contact with some of the leading figures of the various movements that were to shape the style and substance of social sciences into the next century and beyond. Veblen saw the need for taking account of cultural variation in his approach; no universal "human nature" could possibly be invoked to explain the variety of norms and behaviors that the new science of anthropology showed to be the rule, rather than the exception. He emphasized the conflict between "industrial" and "pecuniary" or ceremonial values and this Veblenian dichotomy was interpreted in the hands of later writers as the "ceremonial/instrumental dichotomy" (Hodgson 2004);

Later development 
A seminal article by Armen Alchian (1950) argued for adaptive success of firms faced with uncertainty and incomplete information replacing profit maximization as an appropriate modeling assumption. Milton Friedman proposed that markets act as major selection vehicles. As firms compete, unsuccessful rivals fail to capture an appropriate market shar e, go bankrupt and have to exit. The variety of competing firms is both in their products and practices, that are matched against markets. Both products and practices are determined by routines that firms use: standardized patterns of actions implemented constantly. By imitating these routines, firms propagate them and thus establish inheritance of successful practices. Kenneth Boulding was one of the advocates of the evolutionary methods in social science, as is evident from Kenneth Boulding's Evolutionary Perspective. Kenneth Arrow, Ronald Coase and Douglass North are some of the Bank of Sweden Prize in Economic Sciences in Memory of Alfred Nobel winners who are known for their sympathy to the field.

More narrowly the works Jack Downie and Edith Penrose offer many insights for those thinking about evolution at the level of the firm in an industry.

Nelson and Winter (1982) and after
Richard R. Nelson and Sidney G. Winter's book An Evolutionary Theory of Economic Change (1982, Paperback 1985) was a real seminal work that marked a renaissance of evolutionary economics. It lead to the dissemination of the evolutionary ideas among wide strands of economists and was followed by foundations of International Joseph A. Schumpeter Society, European Association for Evolutionary Political Economy, Japan Association for Evolutionary Economics, and Korean Society for Innovation Management and Economics.

Nelson and Winter have focused mostly on the issue of changes in technology and routines, suggesting a framework for their analysis. Evolution and change must be distinguished. Prices and quantities constantly change but it is not an evolution. For an evolution takes place, there must be something that evolves. Their approach can be compared and contrasted with the population ecology or organizational ecology approach in sociology: see Douma & Schreuder (2013, chapter 11). More recently, Nelson, Dosi, Pyka, Malerba, Winter and other scholars have been proposing an update of the state-of-art in evolutionary economics.

Evolution and change must be distinguished. Prices, quantities and GDPs constantly change through time but they are not evolution. Pier P. Saviotti pointed out as key concepts of evolution three ideas: variation, selection, and reproduction. The concept of reproduction is often replaced by replication or retention. Retention is preferred in evolutionary organization theory. Other related concepts are fitness, adaptation, population, interactions, and environment. Each item is related to selection, learning, population dynamics, economic transactions, and boundary conditions. Nelson and Winter raised two major examples of evolving entities: technologies and organizational routines. Yoshinori Shiozawa listed four entities that evolve: economic behaviors, commodities, technologies, and institutions. Then, mechanisms that provide selection, generate variation and establish self-replication, must be identified. A general theory of this evolutionary process has been proposed by Kurt Dopfer, John Foster and Jason Potts as the micro meso macro framework.

Evolutionary economics had developed and ramified into various fields or topics.  They include technology and economic growth,  institutional economics, organization studies, innovation study, management, and policy, and criticism of mainstream economics.  

Economic processes, as part of life processes, are intrinsically evolutionary. From the evolutionary equation that describe life processes, an analytical formula on the main factors of economic processes, such as fixed cost and variable cost, can be derived. The economic return, or competitiveness, of economic entities of different characteristics under different kinds of environment can be calculated. 

In recent years, evolutionary models have been used to assist decision making in applied settings and find solutions to problems such as optimal product design and service portfolio diversification.

Why does evolution matter in economics
Evolutionary economics emerged from dissatisfaction of mainstream (neoclassical) economics. Mainstream economics mainly assumes agents that optimize their objective functions, such as utility function for consumers and profit for firms. Optimization under budget constraint has a solution if the function is continuous and the prices are positive. However, when the number of goods is large, it is often difficult to obtain the bundles of goods that maximize the utility. This is the question of bounded rationality. Herbert A. Simon once stated in Administrative Behavior that whole contents of management science can be reduced to two lines. The same contentions apply to the economics. Most of economics behaviors except deliberated plans are routines which follows satisficing principle. Evolutionary economics is conceived as an economics of large complex system.

Evolutionary psychology 

A different approach is to apply evolutionary psychology principles to economics which is argued to explain problems such as inconsistencies and biases in rational choice theory. A basic economic concept such as utility may be better explained in terms of a set of biological preferences that maximized evolutionary fitness in the ancestral environment but not necessarily in the current one. In other words, the preferences for actions/decisions that promise "utility" (e.g. reaching for a piece of cake) were formed in the ancestral environment because of the adaptive advantages of such decisions (e.g. maximizing calorie intake). Loss aversion may be explained as being rational when living at subsistence level where a reduction of resources may have meant death and it thus may have been rational to place a greater value on losses than on gains.

People are sometimes more cooperative and altruistic than predicted by economic theory which may be explained by mechanisms such as reciprocal altruism and group selection for cooperative behavior. An evolutionary approach may also explain differences between groups such as males being less risk-averse than females since males have more variable reproductive success than females. While unsuccessful risk-seeking may limit reproductive success for both sexes, males may potentially increase their reproductive success much more than females from successful risk-seeking. Frequency-dependent selection may explain why people differ in characteristics such as cooperative behavior with cheating becoming an increasingly less successful strategy as the numbers of cheaters increase.

Economic theory is at present characterized by strong disagreements on which is the correct theory of value, distribution and growth. This also influences the attempts to find evolutionary explanations for modern tastes and preferences. For example an acceptance of the neoclassical theory of value and distribution lies behind the argument that humans have a poor intuitive grasp of the economics of the current environment which is very different from the ancestral environment. The argument is that ancestral environment likely had relatively little trade, division of labor, and capital goods. Technological change was very slow, wealth differences were much smaller, and possession of many available resources were likely zero-sum games where large inequalities were caused by various forms of exploitation. Humans, therefore, may have poor intuitive understanding of the benefits of free trade (causing calls for protectionism), the value of capital goods (making the labor theory of value appealing), and may intuitively undervalue the benefits of technological development. The same acceptance of the neoclassical thesis that demand for labour is a decreasing function of the real wage and that income differences reflect different marginal productivities of individual contributions (in labour or savings) lies behind the argument that persistence of pre-capitalist model of thinking may explain a tendency to see the number of available jobs as a zero-sum game with the total number of jobs being fixed which causes people to not realize that minimum wage laws reduce the number of jobs or to believe that an increased number of jobs in other nations necessarily decreases the number of jobs in their own nation, as well as a tendency to view large income inequality as due to exploitation rather than as due to individual differences in productivity. This, it is accordingly argued, may easily cause poor economic policies, especially since individual voters have few incentives to make the effort of studying societal economics instead of relying on their intuitions since an individual's vote counts for so little and since politicians may be reluctant to take a stand against intuitive views that are incorrect but widely held.

Evolution after Unified Growth Theory 

The role of evolutionary forces in the process of economic development over the course of human history has been explored in the past few decades. Oded Galor and Omer Moav advanced the hypothesis that evolutionary forces had a significant role in the transition of the world economy from stagnation to growth, highlighting the persistent effects that historical and prehistorical conditions have had on the evolution of the composition of human characteristics during the development process.

Evolution of predisposition towards child quality 
The testable predictions of this evolutionary theory and its underlying mechanisms have been confirmed empirically and quantitatively. Specifically, the genealogical record of half a million people in Quebec during the period 1608-1800, suggests that moderate fecundity, and hence tendency towards investment in child quality, was beneficial for long-run reproductive success. This finding reflect the adverse effect of higher fecundity on marital age of children, their level of education, and the likelihood that they will survive to a reproductive age.

Evolution of time preference 
Oded Galor and Omer Ozak examine the evolution of time preference in the course of human history.

Evolution of loss aversion 
Oded Galor and Viacheslav Savitskiy explore the evolutionary foundation of the phenomenon of loss aversion. They theorize and confirm empirically that the evolution of loss aversion reflects an evolutionary process in which humans have gradually adapted the climatic shocks and their asymmetric effects on reproductive success in a period in which the available resource was very close to the subsistence consumption. In particular, they establish that individuals and ethnic groups that descended from regions that are characterized by greater climatic volatility tend to be loss-neutral, whereas those originated in regions in which climatic conditions are more spatially correlated, tend to be more loss averse.

Evolution of risk aversion 
Oded Galor and Stelios Michalopoulos examine the coevolution of entrepreneurial spirit and the process of long-run economic development. Specifically, they argue that in the early stages of development, risk-tolerant entrepreneurial traits generated an evolutionary advantage, and the rise in the prevalence of this trait amplified the pace of the growth process. However, in advanced stages of development, risk-aversion gained an evolutionary advantage, and contributed to convergence across countries.

See also 

 
 Behavioral economics
 Complexity economics
 Creative destruction
 Cultural economics
 EAEPE
 Ecological model of competition
 Evolutionary socialism
 Hypergamy
 Institutional economics
 Population dynamics
 Innovation system
 Non-equilibrium economics
 Universal Darwinism
 Evolutionary and Institutional Economics Review
 Giovanni Dosi
 Robert H. Frank

References

Further reading 
 Aldrich, Howard E., Geoffrey M. Hodgson, David L. Hull, Thorbjørn Knudsen, Joel Mokyr and Viktor J. Vanberg (2008) ‘In Defence of Generalized Darwinism’, Journal of Evolutionary Economics, 18(5), October, pp. 577–96.
 Canterbery, E. Ray (1998) 'The Theory of the Leisure Class and the Theory of Demand', in Warren G. Samuels (editor), The Founding of Institutional Economics (London and New York: Routledge) pp. 139-56.
 Douma, Sytse & Hein Schreuder (2013). "Economic Approaches to Organizations". 5th edition. London: Pearson. 
 Hodgson, Geoffrey M. (2004) The Evolution of Institutional Economics: Agency, Structure and Darwinism in American Institutionalism (London and New York: Routledge).
 Richard R. Nelson and Sidney G. Winter. (1982). An Evolutionary Theory of Economic Change. Harvard University Press.
 Shiozawa, Yoshinori (2004) Evolutionary Economics in the 21st Century: A Manifext, Evolutionary and Institutional Economics Review 1(1), November, pp. 5–47.
 
 Veblen, Thorstein B. (1898) ‘Why Is Economics Not an Evolutionary Science?’, Quarterly Journal of Economics, 12(3), July, pp. 373–97.
 Madureira, A., den Hartog, F. & Baken, N., "A holonic framework to understand and apply information processes in evolutionary economics: survey and proposal", Netnomics (2016) 17: 157. doi:10.1007/s11066-016-9107-1 (http://rdcu.be/nqEg).

Journals
 Journal of Economic Issues, sponsored by the Association for Evolutionary Economics. 
 Journal of Evolutionary Economics. Description, sponsored by the International Josef Schumpeter Society.
 Journal of Institutional Economics, sponsored by the European Society for Evolutionary Political Economy.
  Evolutionary and Institutional Economics Review, sponsored by the Japan Association for Evolutionary Economics (Springer).
 "The Nature of Value: How to invest in the Adaptive economy", book on the economy as an evolutionary system
 Netnomics (Springer)

External links

"Evolutionary Economics et al." by Prof. Esben S. Andersen - Aalborg University, Denmark
Evolutionary Economics by J.P. Birchall
Methodology of Evolutionary Economics by V. Piana

Innovation economics
Schools of economic thought
Dichotomies
Thorstein Veblen